Chen Hsiao-nan (15 January 1908 – 14 October 1993) was a Chinese painter. His work was part of the painting event in the art competition at the 1948 Summer Olympics.

References

1908 births
1993 deaths
20th-century Chinese painters
Chinese painters
Olympic competitors in art competitions
People from Liyang